Criticism of TV Globo (formerly Rede Globo until 2021) refers to the extensive history of controversies involving the Brazilian television network, which has an unparalleled ability to influence Brazil's culture and shape the country's public opinion. The owners of Rede Globo had enriched themselves with government favors to become billionaires. The Globo Grupo are remanagment the branding in the internet for self-promote since 2010's decade.

The main historical controversy surrounding the television network, as well as the remainder of Grupo Globo (formerly known as Globo Organizations) media empire, is centered on the news broadcasts' support for the Brazilian military government and its censorship of pro-democracy developments. According to critics of the broadcaster, the military regime provided government concessions to Rede Globo, which had very poor coverage of the 1984 Diretas Já protests. In 2013, pressured by protests in Brazil, Rede Globo admitted in the Jornal Nacional that its support given to the 1964 Brazilian coup d'état and the subsequent regime was "a mistake".

In the late 1980s, Grupo Globo was targeted by critics due to edits made to the pre-recorded television debates between the presidential candidates in the 1989 election. The edits to the final debate favored candidate Fernando Collor de Mello, who won the election. Towards the end of the 1990s, Grupo Globo faced severe financial problems and was bailed out by the government, despite being a strictly private company. During this period, the conglomerate utilized its influence in the political arena and changed an article in the Constitution of Brazil to allow 30% of foreign capital investment in the country's media sector.

In 2002, the federal government offered R$280million in assistance to the Globocabo cable TV company, part of Grupo Globo, by financing through the Brazilian Development Bank.

Rede Globo was again criticized for its biased coverage of the 2006 and 2010 elections.

Accusations of political influence

Support of military regime 

TV Globo was founded in 1965 as Rede Globo, one year after the 1964 Brazilian coup d'état, and it became the largest television network in Brazil during the 1970s. During this period, Brazil's military government implemented a policy to modernize Brazil's telecommunications infrastructure. In 1965, the government created Embratel at the same time that Brazil was joining Intelsat. In 1968, the Ministry of Communications was created, the first FM radio stations appeared, and the AERP (Assessoria Especial de Relações Públicas) was created, reinforcing the need to propagate patriotic ideas and nationalism. Brazil integrated with the global system of satellite communications in 1969. The military government intended to oppose the left, which was culturally dominant at the time. One of the government's weapons would have been television, with the regime turning a blind eye to the partnership between the former Chairman of Grupo Globo Roberto Marinho and the multinational Time-Life Television, which was prohibited by law. This illegal partnership contributed to the technological jump of Rede Globo.

According to Grupo Globo, the conglomerate's newspaper O Globo supported the 1964 military coup by following the "widely held majority opinion" against the administration of former president João Goulart. Grupo Globo also stated that Roberto Marinho believed in the democratic aspirations of the military president Castelo Branco and the efficiency of the economic policies developed by Minister of Planning Roberto Campos and Minister of Finance Octavio Gouvêa de Bulhões. However, the media conglomerate denied that Rede Globo's growth was due to the close relationship between Roberto Marinho and the military regime, citing the difficulties in obtaining licenses for TV stations in the cities of João Pessoa and Curitiba in 1978. Rede Globo had some cases of censorship in its programming, and some of its professionals were members of the Brazilian Communist Party.

In his autobiography, Walter Clark, the general manager of Rede Globo, confessed to canceling the programs of journalist Carlos Heitor Cony and economist Roberto Campos to satisfy the chief of police of Rio de Janeiro. He hired a former government censorship agent to "read everything going on air" and formed an advisory committee composed of general Paiva Chave, right-wing conservative hard-liner Edgardo Manoel Erickson, and "some five or six employees". Clark received visits from military president Emílio Garrastazu Médici because of his offices at Rede Globo, and they would watch soccer matches shown by the broadcaster on Sundays. According to Clark, the so-called "Globo standard of quality" ended up "going through the looking-glass of a regime which the TV Globo professionals never agreed with".

In interviews made for the British documentary film Beyond Citizen Kane (1993), former Minister of Justice Armando Falcão claimed that "Roberto Marinho never gave me any problems. When I was the minister in charge of censorship and he was the director of the TV Globo network, Radio Globo, Radio Mundial and Radio Eldorado, he never gave me any trouble." In an interview about Rede Globo's news program Jornal Nacional, the military president Emílio Garrastazu Médici said, "I feel good every evening when I turn on the TV to watch Jornal Nacional. While the news report of strikes, protests, attacks and conflicts in various parts of the world, Brazil marches in peace, towards development. It is as if I took a tranquilizer after a day's work". In 2012, a former deputy of the Department of Political and Social Order (DOPS) noted the proximity between the military regime and Rede Globo.

In 2013, Grupo Globo publicly acknowledged their role in politics and apologized to the Brazilian people for supporting the military dictatorship established in Brazil after the 1964 coup. The apology was published in an editorial in O Globo and was read by news anchor William Bonner on Jornal Nacional's evening TV news. The editorial states: "In the light of history, however, there is no reason not to acknowledge, today, explicitly, that the support for the 1964 coup was a mistake, as well as other wrong editorial decisions in the period elapsed since that original mistake. Democracy is an unconditional value. And when in risk, it can only be saved by itself."

Diretas Já protest 

On 25 January 1984, the Rede Globo network aired the first large rally of the Diretas Já movement in the Praça da Sé public square of São Paulo. Rede Globo's Jornal Nacional program had planned a segment on the protests, lasting two minutes and seventeen seconds. However, there was a misunderstanding during the transition to the Jornal Nacional. 25 January happened to be the founding date of São Paulo, and supposedly due to a technical error, the news anchor announced that the rally was part of the ceremonies marking the 430th anniversary of the city. The broadcaster received accusations that the purported technical blunder was intentional manipulation of the facts. José Bonifácio de Oliveira Sobrinho, known as Boni, the former Vice President of Grupo Globo, confirmed during an interview with journalist Roberto D'Ávila in 2005 that Roberto Marinho was the one who suppressed the coverage of the first large rally of the Diretas Já movement. According to Boni, "Mr. Roberto did not want mention of Diretas Já" and Marinho decided that the event in Praça da Sé would be reported, "without any participation of any of the dissenters". What would have occurred, according to him, was "double censorship" by the government regime and broadcaster. The official claim by Rede Globo, mentioned in the book Jornal Nacional - A Notícia Faz História, is that the broadcaster did not suppress news of the Diretas Já rally and the rumor that the broadcaster announced the event as part of the commemorations of the city's anniversary is false.

Proconsult scheme 
Rede Globo is alleged to have been complicit in the so-called Proconsult scheme in 1982, an attempt at election fraud in the gubernatorial race of the state of Rio de Janeiro. The scheme would have prevented the victory of Leonel Brizola, candidate for the Democratic Labour Party (PDT), by counting all blank, invalid, null, and hanging chad votes to his opponent Moreira Franco. The company Proconsult, contracted by the Brazilian elections commission to tally the votes, had built a computerized system to count the ballots. However, their results did not match an independent exit poll conducted by newspaper Jornal do Brasil under the supervision of journalist Paulo Henrique Amorim. O Globo had published an editorial in favor of candidate Moreira Franco on the eve of the election day, and stuck to the count numbers coming from Proconsult.

According to journalist Hélio Fernandes of newspaper Tribuna da Imprensa, the scheme did not succeed only due to the involvement of the deputy from the Rio de Janeiro Police, Manoel Vidal, who had been sent to officiate the vote count. Vidal noticed that something was not right during the counting process, and proceeded to contact Brizola's lawyer Arnaldo Campana. Brizola, having been silenced and shut out by Grupo Globo's media outlets, gave an interview to foreign news correspondents explaining the situation that had occurred. The fraud was exposed and the journalists from Rede Globo were harassed in the streets of Rio de Janeiro. Rede Globo, in turn, argued that it "never hired Proconsult" and its results were based on numbers from O Globo, who were claimed to be responsible for conducting an aggregate vote count from electoral maps.

Takeover of NEC Brazil
Under the military government, NEC Brazil, a subsidiary of the Japanese NEC Corporation, was forced to nationalize its corporate stock. Because of this, NEC Brazil ceded shareholder control of the company to Brazilian investment banker Mário Garnero's private equity group Brasilinvest. 
Before military rule, during Brazil's re-democratization period, NEC Brazil had become the major supplier of telecommunications equipment to the Brazilian government. On March 18, 1985, the Central Bank of Brazil, through a decree by the then Minister of Finance, Francisco Dornelles, initiated the liquidation of Garnero's group, that was accused of lack of liquidity and embezzlement of funds to shell companies abroad. Garnero filed for preventive concordat of all Brasilinvest companies. The government would not accept the contracting of companies controlled by a concordatary, which led the then Minister of Communications Antônio Carlos Magalhães to suspend government contracts with the company on April 29, 1986. Due to the crisis of the Brazilian group, the NEC Corporation in Japan re-purchased part of the shares of NEC Brazil. In December 1986, 51% of the shares were sold to Grupo Globo, while Garnero got 25% of the capital in preferred shares, and NEC got 58% of the total shares (being 42% preferred shares and 16% common shares). After the shareholder changes, ACM reinstated the contracts with the company, as well as initiating new ones.

On November 10, 1986, Rede Globo made official the non-renewal of its affiliation contract with TV Aratu, its then affiliate since 1969, determining that the station cease broadcasting its programming on January 20, 1987, after the end of the extension of the expiry time of the contract. The network had already expressed to TV Aratu its intention not to renew the affiliation contract on February 24 of that year, due to the dissatisfaction existing since 1984 on the part of Globo regarding technical and commercial problems of the then Bahia affiliate. TV Bahia, owned by Magalhães' son, ACM Júnior, and son-in-law, César Mata Pires, was originally an affiliate of Rede Manchete, a competitor network of Globo owned by Adolpho Bloch, and was chosen to replace TV Aratu. ACM's opponents, however, raised suspicions that the then minister had benefited Globo with the aim of transforming his family's station into an affiliate of the network. On January 13, the congressman Luís Viana Neto, an shareholder of TV Aratu, along with 19 other deputies, went to Brasília to complaint to then president José Sarney about the supposed interference of Magalhães in the state communications. A court battle was started by the owners of TV Aratu against Globo and TV Bahia in January 15, when Judge Luiz Fux, of the 9th Civil Court of Rio de Janeiro, give to TV Aratu an injunction preventing TV Bahia from retransmitting Globo's programming.

On January 23, Globo overturned this injunction through a writ of mandamus at the Court of Justice of the State of Rio de Janeiro, ensuring the transmission of its programming by TV Bahia, which started the new affiliation as soon as received the notification, at 5:58 pm that day. Shortly after, Pedro Jack Kapeller, then director of Rede Manchete, stated that there was no need to take legal action regarding TV Bahia's position, as "everything happened strictly within the norms stipulated by the contracts signed between the parties". After several court decisions, the battle ended on July 6, when the court ruled in Globo's favor, finally allowing TV Bahia to be the network's exclusive affiliate in Bahia.

The non-renewal of the affiliation contract with Globo resulted in an 80% drop in TV Aratu's ratings. The former Globo-affiliated station continued to appeal the decision until April 1996, when judicial remedies have been exhausted, and the process ratifyed Globo's legal right to transfer its programming to TV Bahia. TV Aratu, which at the time was operated under a lease agreement by CNT, had its building auctioned for refusing to pay the procedural fees.

Suspicions regarding the NEC-Globo deal took the national stage on June 9, 1992, when a Parliamentary Commission of Inquiry was established to investigate the case, requested by congressman Paulo Ramos (PDT) in May 1987. The charges against ACM were rejected and removed from the text of the report, which was approved unanimously on November 17. Mussa Demes (PFL), president of the commission, affirmed that "if Governor Antônio Carlos had acted differently, he would have irremediably compromised the country's telecommunications system and could be answering today for omission", considering, as did the majority of the commission members, that the then-minister had suspended the contracts with NEC in order to prevent Garnero from using these resources to reverse the Central Bank's intervention in Brasilinvest.

The commission concluded that there was no irregularity in the transaction, accusing Mario Garnero of lying in front of the commission when he said he had lost money in the sale and that businessmen in the telecommunications area had suffered pressure not to negotiate NEC Brazil. At the time of the transaction, he had received new shares of the company, cancellation of debts, payment of preventive concordat of NEC and an additional 6 million. In addition, the businessmen cited by him sent a letter to the commission denying the alleged pressures exerted by people linked to Globo.

In 1999, with the break-up and privatization of the state-owned telephone monopoly Telebrás, Grupo Globo sold their shares in NEC Brazil.
The European and American phone operators who acquired shares of the broken-up monopoly chose to stay with their existing western partners for their technological needs, and thus NEC Brazil's market share had reduced.

1989 elections and impeachment 

Rede Globo is accused of helping to elect presidential candidate Fernando Collor de Mello, owner of Rede Globo affiliate TV Gazeta in the state of Alagoas, in the 1989 presidential election by manipulating segments of televised and pre-recorded final debate between Collor and Luiz Inácio Lula da Silva, the left-wing candidate from the Workers' Party. Before the debate, in the second round of voting (runoff), the polls showed a technical tie between the two candidates, so the televised confrontation would be a decisive factor in the race. Lula lost the election due to the debate, which his party acknowledged.

Rede Globo had initially sought an exemption from the law mandating full coverage of the elections but decided against it just when the technical tie was pronounced. Two TV news reports were aired on 15 December 1989 about the last debate, on the eve of the runoff vote. One was shown on Jornal Hoje and the other on Jornal Nacional, the latter being more controversial as it is thought to have been biased towards Collor by showing his best debate moments along with Lula's worst moments. The Workers' Party filed a lawsuit against Rede Globo in the Supreme Court of Brazil. The plaintiff wanted new excerpts from the debate to be aired by invoking the Right of Reply article from the Brazilian Constitution, but the request was ultimately denied by the court.

Rede Globo denied that it was a deliberate act of manipulation while admitting that the segment was not balanced. According to Grupo Globo's former Vice President José Bonifácio de Oliveira Sobrinho, the central news bureau of the company made a report biased to Collor, not following the company's directive for the coverage to be impartial. Previously, Roberto Marinho said that Boni did not understand the election and that the Jornal Nacional had summarized the debate correctly, and claimed that Collor had done better in the actual debate. In 2009, 20 years after the election day, Collor admitted that he was favored by Rede Globo in the contest.

Large parts of the Brazilian media had openly supported Collor's presidential campaign. However, according to historian Gilberto Maringoni, due to Collor's party's inability to maintain a majority in congress and confrontations with a vocal faction of the country's corporate interests, Collor was the cause of the eventual change in tone in the national press. Brazil's economic crisis due to the return of hyperinflation, the confiscation of Brazilians' bank savings, and the intense investigative journalism of the press precipitated the grassroots social protests that culminated with Collor's impeachment.

Leonel Brizola's right of reply

In March 1994, Jornal Nacional aired the right of reply obtained by Leonel Brizola, then-governor of the state of Rio de Janeiro, after a two-year legal battle. Brizola had gone to court against Grupo Globo in 1992, after it was revealed that O Globo intended to publish an editorial titled "Understanding Brizola's Rage" the next day, 6 February of that year. Grupo Globo, who wanted to block Brizola from broadcasting Rio's carnival parade by Rede Manchete, used the newspaper's editorial board to accuse Brizola of suffering from "declining mental health" and of "management ineptitude".

In the written response, approved by the Judge of Law of the 18th Criminal Court of Rio de Janeiro City and read on-air by news anchor Cid Moreira, Brizola stated that he did not recognize Grupo Globo as an "authority in matters of freedom of the press" and that the media empire had a "long and friendly relationship with the authoritarian regime and with the 20-year dictatorship that had ruled our country". Brizola stated that he was "made out to be some senile person". He argued, "Now, I am 70 years-old, 16 less than my slanderer, Roberto Marinho, who is 86 years old. If this is your notion of men of a certain age, then apply it to yourself".

In a retrospective article in 2009, media observer Observatório da Imprensa weighed in that "Brizola's contributions to the country, in the political arena and in social progress, were never that great [...] but this famous incident was a watershed event in the history of the freedom of the press. It stood for a shorthand for an action multiplier and for the increase of denunciations from the newspapers and journalists that followed".

2006 elections 

Rede Globo has been heavily criticized for its coverage of the general elections of 2006. The network is alleged to have been biased against the re-election campaign of then-president Luiz Inácio Lula da Silva by exaggerating the exposure of negative facts surrounding his Workers' Party. Luiz Carlos Azenha, the reporter assigned to cover the competing campaign of presidential candidate Geraldo Alckmin, stated that coverage of the Workers' Party was deliberately biased. According to Azenha, "it was determined from Rio de Janeiro that the economic reports should be dismissed because they could supposedly benefit Lula's re-election". Azenha confirmed that one of his own stories, which was potentially damaging for José Serra, the gubernatorial candidate for São Paulo state, was censored by Rede Globo. The criticism over the election coverage led the network to internally initiate a failed attempt at a petition supporting its editorial stance.

The most condemned event by critics occurred on the eve of the first round of voting (the primary). Rede Globo had heavily highlighted the images of the cash confiscated in the Dossiêgate scandal. It is currently known that the deputy of the Brazil federal police who supervised the operation had invited four journalists from Rede Globo for a private meeting and passed the CDs containing the photos to them. The audio of the meeting was completely recorded on tape and the deputy could be heard asking for the images to be shown in the Jornal Nacional TV news program for the same day, 29September 2006. Rede Globo showed the images in its network programming the same night, but its news program did not cover the tragedy of the Gol Flight 1907 crash in which 154 people died. Thus, while news of the plane crash was being picked up around the world, the Rede Globo live news team was dedicated only to the spread of the political scandal.

Rede Globo later stated that "it was impossible to announce the news [of the crash] during the broadcast of the news program, since they had no concrete information about the accident".

A few weeks after the end of the elections, Rodrigo Vianna, a reporter leaving Rede Globo, released an open letter criticizing several of the network's positions during the elections period, giving his view of the internal operations. In the letter, Vianna claims, like Azenha, that network orders barred reports and investigations involving the Brazilian Social Democracy Party and its gubernatorial candidate for São Paulo state José Serra. According to Vianna, some journalists questioned the editorial actions of Rede Globo but did not receive convincing explanations from their superiors. Soon after the elections, Vianna was moved from political reporting and dispatched to work on local newspapers. The network's political commentator Franklin Martins, who would later become the Press Secretary for then-president Lula, was also dismissed that year. Vianna said, "From Bom Dia Brasil to Jornal da Globo, we have a parade of people who are all on the same side".

2010 elections

Anniversary jingle 
On 18 April 2010, Rede Globo launched a new marketing campaign celebrating its 45-year anniversary in the newsmagazine TV show Fantástico. The date of Rede Globo's anniversary was 26 April. In the commercials, the network's logo appeared next to the number 45, and next to it, soap opera actors recited the jingle "we all want more". At one point in the commercial, the actors recited, "We all want more. Education, health, and, of course, love and peace. Brazil? Much more". According to André Luís Vargas Ilário, congressman from Paraná state at the time and press secretary for the Workers' Party, the jingle had a secretly embedded propaganda message favorable to José Serra, the presidential candidate for the Brazilian Social Democracy Party (PSDB). The embedded message had "45", the registration number of the PSDB with the Superior Electoral Court. The jingle phrasing "we all want more", according to Workers' Party critics, was a reference to the Serra campaign slogan "Brazil can be more".

Rede Globo pulled the TV spot off the air on the first day of the 45-year company anniversary campaign. The network stated that the ad was created in November 2009, when "candidate's campaigns did not exist, let alone slogans, but Rede Globo will not give excuses for accusations of bias and it is suspending the ad". Columnist Luís Nassif, however, challenged the network's justification, claiming that the commercial spot was shot on 14 April, three days after Serra launched his campaign. Nassif pointed to the news release on Rede Globo's website as evidence.

José Serra attack 
During the second round (runoff) campaign, Rede Globo reported that José Serra was assaulted with a roll of duct tape by Workers' Party militants during a campaign stop in Rio de Janeiro, fell ill, and then headed to a hospital where he was examined. He had canceled all remaining appointments for the day by doctor's orders. However, competing network SBT showed a video recording of Serra being hit by a paper ball, walking until he received a phone call, and 20 minutes later, putting his hand on his head to complain about the "blow". Serra then had a CT scan done, but no injuries were found. The incident generated a wave of criticism on Twitter due to the false version of events promoted by Rede Globo, trending the hashtags #SerraRojas (a reference to Chilean soccer player Roberto Rojas who deliberately injured himself during a match) and #BolinhadePapelFacts ("paper ball facts").

On 21 October 2010, the Folha de S.Paulo newspaper published a report revealing that Serra was hit by a roll of duct tape after the paper ball. The same day, Jornal Nacional aired a complete report on the incident. On 22 October, newspapers Folha de S.Paulo and O Estado de S. Paulo, both of which are independent of Grupo Globo, confirmed that Serra was hit in two separate occasions: first by a paper ball, and then by a roll of duct tape. SBT confirmed in its TV news program SBT Brasil that the images of the paper ball preceded the scene with the roll of duct tape. Five days later, the magazine Veja published an article titled "Beating club in democracy", in which journalist Fabio Portela accused SBT of omitting the footage of the roll of duct tape that had been thrown at Serra's head.
 SBT network, in turn, responded that "the SBT Brasil episode aired the day the incident, Thursday the 20th, showed only the footage captured by our cameras, which had the scene with the paper ball. Until that moment we had no knowledge of the existence of the other video captured by a Folha de S.Paulo journalist, using a cell phone, showing the later event, in which the roll of duct tape reaches the head of candidate Serra.
Upon learning this, SBT proceeded to broadcast it on the same day in the midnight newscast. In SBT Brasil the next day, Friday, the news presenter Carlos Nascimento returned to the topic, pointing out that the second event was not captured by his team, but stressed that the candidate Jose Serra was hit twice in a span of a few minutes."

2012 elections 

Rede Globo was criticized for its coverage of the Mensalão scandal, a corruption trial involving the Workers' Party, which coincided with the Brazilian municipal elections of 2012. In October 2012, on the eve of the second round of voting (runoff) for the municipal elections, the Jornal Nacional (part of Grupo Globo) dedicated 18 minutes of its 32-minute show to the trial. The show was aired immediately following the televised free electoral program (propaganda eleitoral gratuita, or free political advertising) that, in São Paulo, ended with the spot for mayoral candidate Fernando Haddad from the Workers' Party. The news of the Mensalão scandal was always shown after the end of the free electoral program during the entire second-round campaign period.

2013 protests 

During a series of grassroots protests that took place in many cities across Brazil in 2013, demonstrations occurred in front of the Rede Globo's affiliate stations throughout the country. The network's main office in São Paulo had manure thrown at the front of the building and had its walls were defaced.
 In protests at the Rede Globo headquarters in Rio de Janeiro, demonstrators clashed with the police.

Rede Globo was targeted for protests through online social networks and community organizations. On 19 June, during Jornal Nacional TV news, presenter Patrícia Poeta read an editorial written by Rede Globo itself, speaking of the acts against the network. The next day, the network aired scenes of demonstrations across the country.
The broadcast of a soccer match of the 2013 FIFA Confederations Cup had been scheduled for the same day, but it was canceled because the network prioritized the coverage of the protests; two soap operas did not air that day either: Flor do Caribe and Sangue Bom.
Because of this, the network saw a drop in ratings, but its gesture was well-received on the internet. The station has also been accused of focusing exclusively on acts of vandalism in its coverage of the protests.

2014 elections 

On 8 August 2014, an article published in O Globo stated that a device connected to the internet through the wireless network of the Palácio do Planalto, the official office of the President of Brazil, changed information in the Portuguese language Wikipedia pages of Rede Globo journalists Miriam Leitão and Carlos Alberto Sardenberg with the intention of defamation. The edits, made in May 2013, qualified Leitão's analysis as "disastrous" and accused her of having "passionately" defended the banker Daniel Dantas when he was arrested by the Brazilian Federal Police, citing one of Leitão's comments in Grupo Globo's Rádio CBN where she defended Dantas' innocence. The edits accused Sardenberg of being critical of the government's interest rate policy because his brother worked in the Brazilian Federation of Banks, a business association of private banks.

The Palácio do Planalto, in a press release, explained that there was no way to identify the author of the edits since the IP address used to do so served both the internal network and the wireless network, which would allow for the possibility of any visitor to have made the changes. The presidential offices identified the Wikipedia editor as a civil servant in the Office of Institutional Relations and the employee was dismissed.
Grupo Globo was criticized for disclosing the alterations to the biographies of their employees in Wikipedia, since, according to Wikipedia's creator Jimmy Wales, it should not be used as the primary source of information. The network was further criticized for only announcing the alterations during the 2014 election campaign season. The journalist Miguel do Rosário, who is not an employee of Grupo Globo, reported on a similar case that occurred in the Department of Data Processing of the State of São Paulo's wireless network, where someone had inserted a slanderous statement in the Portuguese language Wikipedia's biography of Brazilian musician Raul Seixas. Rosário stated that he had visited the Palácio do Planalto, where he had obtained the wireless password for the presidential office. Rede Globo, according to critics, was disgruntled with the possibility of information dissemination produced in a non-linear fashion via the internet.

Government advertising funds 
During the administration of former president Dilma Rousseff from 2011 to 2016, the state paid for almost half of Rede Globo and its subsidiaries' TV advertising funds.

Operation Car Wash

In an interview for the Agência Pública, after the first revelations from The Intercept about the actions of former judge Sérgio Moro in Operation Car Wash, Glenn Greenwald said that Rede Globo and the "mainstream media", except for the newspaper O Estado de S. Paulo and independent journalists, worked with Lava Jato in "publishing what the task force wanted them to publish."

The broadcaster countered Greenwald's criticism by saying that Greenwald had contacted them to propose a new journalistic partnership because of the work that had been done on the revelations of Edward Snowden's global surveillance. Globo said that despite having been offered the material, Greenwald did not want to provide information about the content of the revelations and the origin of the data. Because of this, the issuer would have refused the offer. On 7 June, Greenwald sent an email stating that he had received no response from Globo and should assume that the station wasn't interested in reporting this material. There were no further contacts between the parties.

Ricardo Kotscho, writing to Observatório da Imprensa, criticized the journalistic coverage that SBT, Rede Globo, and RecordTV (previously Rede Record) gave to the facts concerning hackers and The Intercept:

Sports controversies

Pre-recorded UFC fight 
On 27 May 2012, an Ultimate Fighting Championship match was aired by Rede Globo and billed as a "live broadcast", but channel Combate, a part of Grupo Globo's pay-per-view service Globosat, had shown the fight 30 minutes earlier than Rede Globo. Rede Globo had pre-recorded the fight but put "live" on top of its TV logo bug, which generated a lot of criticism, especially on social networking services.

Sports coverage monopoly

Rede Globo is frequently accused of holding a monopoly on sports broadcasts, primarily the Campeonato Brasileiro de Futebol. The monopoly, which began in the early 1990s, was possible because of the launch of the first subscription-TV services (cable and satellite) in Brazil, which coincided with the withdrawal of major competing networks' interests in airing such sporting events because they had high transmission costs and low ratings. After that, with those rights offered to Grupo Globo, it set up a cartel with Rede Bandeirantes which prevented all other networks from broadcasting the matches. Since then, the two have been the only ones to air any games.

On 20 October 2010, after 10 years of failed attempts, the Administrative Council for Economic Defense (CADE), a government antitrust agency, issued guidance for Clube dos 13 (a group containing the 20 major league teams of Brazilian association football) for it not to give preferences to Rede Globo for the broadcasting rights of the Campeonato Brasileiro de Futebol matches and for it to start offering different transmission packages for each media type (over-the-air TV, cable TV, pay-per-view TV, internet TV, mobile TV) from the 2012 to 2014 championships. Nevertheless, Clube dos 13 disregarded the guidance of CADE and signed a contract with Rede Globo for all media types. Rede Globo maintained its monopoly on the broadcast of the Campeonato Brasileiro de Futebol matches until 2015.

According to Rede Record's sports show Esporte Fantástico, which aired on 17 August 2013, Rede Globo is the main reason for the low attendance in matches for the Campeonato Brasileiro de Futebol for that year. The report asserts that Rede Globo's affiliate in Rio de Janeiro demands that the games start only after the end of its primetime 9pm soap operas. This results in a kick-off of 10pm, making it difficult for the public to be present at the stadiums. A few days earlier, in an interview with the Lancenet website, player Alexsandro de Souza of the Coritiba Foot Ball Club declared that the network's practices are heartless towards sports fans.

Rede Record was able to break Rede Globo's monopoly with its acquisition of rights to the Olympics and Pan American Games from 2010 through 2015. Globo did acquire rights to the 2016 Summer Olympics but chose to sub-license portions of the coverage to Record and Band. Nevertheless, Rede Globo maintains the broadcast rights for the 2018 and 2022 FIFA World Cup through a bidding process criticized by Rede Record for its lack of transparency.

Other controversies

Money laundry 
According to the Banestado files revealed by Rede Record, Rede Globo laundered R$1.6 billion.

Tax troubles and missing charity money 
According to the revenue service, the corporation engaged in accounting fraud by negotiating R$158 million in debt forgiveness or discharge with the JPMorgan Chase bank in 2005. The network, fined R$730 million, disputed the charges but was defeated in one of the cases brought by the Ministry of Finance in September 2013. Furthermore, the company withheld payment of corporate income taxes through the use of tax havens to purchase the broadcasting rights for the 2002 FIFA World Cup. Upon completion of the investigation in October 2006, the revenue service intended to impose a fine of R$615 million on the broadcaster. A few weeks later, the docket disappeared from the revenue service's headquarters in Rio de Janeiro. In January 2013, a government employee of the revenue service, Cristina Maris Meinick Ribeiro, was sentenced to four years in prison for being responsible for the disappearance. During the trial, she claimed to have acted freely and on her own accord.

A document dated 15 September 2006, released by WikiLeaks in 2013, stated that Rede Globo passed to UNESCO only 10% of the amount collected since 1986 through the annual Criança Esperança telethon, a charity fundraiser benefiting poor children and promoted in partnership with the United Nations. Rede Globo said "to ignore" this information and claimed that "all the money raised by the campaign is deposited directly to the UNESCO account".

Beyond Citizen Kane 

In 1993, British network Channel 4 broadcast a documentary film directed by Simon Hartog titled Beyond Citizen Kane, which tells the story of Rede Globo and its "dark deeds" up to 1990. The documentary has been forbidden in Brazil since 1994, due to a lawsuit filed by Roberto Marinho. There are currently a few copies in circulation in Brazil, and pirated versions exist on the internet on websites such as YouTube. Participants in the film include artists, politicians, and experts: Luiz Inácio Lula da Silva, Chico Buarque, Washington Olivetto, and others. The documentary has never been shown in Brazilian theaters and the premiere that would have normally taken place in the Museum of Modern Art in Rio de Janeiro was banned by the president at the time Itamar Franco.

In Brazil, the documentary was titled in Portuguese as Muito Além do Cidadão Kane. The title originated from the character Charles Foster Kane, created in 1941 by writer and director Orson Welles for the film Citizen Kane, a dramatized fictional film based on the life of William Randolph Hearst, the American newspaper business magnate. According to Beyond Citizen Kane, Rede Globo uses the same vulgar manipulation of news to influence public opinion as Kane did in the Welles' film.
According to an article published on the Folha de S.Paulo website on 28 August 2009, an independent production company created the film and the British public television broadcaster BBC had no involvement in its development whatsoever. However, Rede Record maintains that the BBC was involved in the documentary's production.

The documentary is divided in four parts:
 The relationship between Rede Globo and the military regime period
 The deal struck between the Rede Globo and the American Time-Life Television
 The power of the network's owner Roberto Marinho
 "The illegal activities and means of manipulation utilized by Grupo Globo in their shadow partnerships with the powers in Brasília". The documentary has no primary sources, only interviews.

Rede Globo had attempted to purchase the rights to the film. However, before his death, director Simon Hartog formed an agreement with Brazilian organizations so that the domestic rights to the documentary would not fall into the hands of the network so that it would be possible for it to be widely disseminated by political and cultural organizations. The network lost interest in buying the film after their lawyers discovered the clause, but to this day a court order prohibits the showing of Beyond Citizen Kane in Brazil. According to the Folha de S.Paulo newspaper, in the 1990s, Rede Record had tried to purchase the broadcasting rights to the documentary, but "realized that there would be a legal dispute with the Rede Globo about the many video clips taken from their programming. Therefore it decided not to buy it". In August 2009, at the height of an exchange of accusations between the networks caused by money laundering charges of the Universal Church of the Kingdom of God, Rede Record bought the broadcast rights for the documentary for approximately $20 million US dollars and awaits the authorization from the courts to show it on TV.

Papa-Tudo 

In the early 1990s, to compete with Tele Sena, a prize-linked savings account run by Grupo Silvio Santos, Rede Globo launched Papa-Tudo in partnership with bankers. Papa-Tudo had César Filho and Fausto Silva as presenters and Xuxa Meneghel as the spokesmodel.
The Papa-Tudo and Tele Sena savings titles were sold similarly: the public would acquire the titles at lottery shops or the post office, and if the title was not a winner of the lottery drawing, then the buyer could get back half of the money paid into the account after one year or purchase a new title for half the price. Even before the launch of Papa-Tudo, the journalist Helio Fernandes of Tribuna da Imprensa newspaper said that "it smelled like a great business and a venture between Roberto Marinho did not have a chance in a million of failure."

According to Observatório da Imprensa: "[...] they promised that, besides the buyback guarantee, the future buyers would still be eligible to compete in millions in prizes and part of the revenues would still be destined for charity. They infested the whole of Brazil with miraculous promises of easy riches, always headlined by the exclusiveness of Rede Globo, the unsuspecting Xuxa, and the good will of charities. Lulled by the TV heroes of Rede Globo and the UNICEF 'ambassadors', the whole country purchased, again and again, the little notes, broadcast by Rede Globo and presented by impeccable Xuxa." However, because of the company's liquidity problems, the post office and lottery shops started having difficulties redeeming the titles. The company was liquidated by watchdog Susep, and eventually paid all of its obligations. No one from Rede Globo was held responsible.

Purchase of TV Paulista 
In 1955, Oswaldo Ortiz Monteiro decided to sell his television station TV Paulista to communications company Victor Costa Organizations because of difficulties that it faced. 55% of the outstanding stock, consisting of 15,099 shares, was turned over to the conglomerate. Victor Costa died while awaiting the transfer of TV Paulista to his name to be approved by the National Department of Telecommunications (DENTEL). Costa's son was left in charge, but control of the stock was still in the name of the former shareholders. Nine years later, the TV channel was sold to Roberto Marinho, even without the transfer documents, but the original controlling shares remained with the Ortiz Monteiro family for over 13 years. In 1977, DENTEL approved the stock transfer from Ortiz Monteiro to Roberto Marinho based on receipts and proxies presented by Rede Globo. The station was transformed into TV Globo São Paulo, the Rede Globo affiliate for the city of São Paulo.

Oswaldo Ortiz Monteiro's death in 1990, his family began investigating for possible fraud in the purchase of TV Paulista by Rede Globo.
A forensic examination of the documents performed in 2003 by the Del Picchia institute in São Paulo revealed that the signatures were forged, the names of persons deceased before the transfer were included, and typewriters, which did not exist in the country at the time, were used. The lawyers representing Rede Globo brought the expert testimony of Antonio Nunes da Silva attesting that the receipts and affidavits in possession of the Marinho family were authentic. In 2010, the Brazilian supreme court confirmed that the documents were genuine. However, four years later, senator Roberto Requião of the state of Paraná sponsored a bill in the Federal Senate with a motion to the Ministry of Communications to approve the transfer of TV Paulista to the Marinho family.

TV Diário removed from satellite

On 25 February 2009, TV Diário, a network belonging to Sistema Verdes Mares, stopped its transmission for satellite dishes, through which it reached South America, parts of the Caribbean, and its affiliate stations spread throughout Brazil. Sistema Verdes Mares also owned the TV station TV Verdes Mares in the state of Ceará; however, the station was an affiliate of Rede Globo instead. TV Diário's discontinuation of its satellite signal surprised viewers, and those who had tried and failed to watch TV Diário through affiliate ground stations started to follow other networks. According to information obtained before and after TV Diário went off the air, the network stopped its satellite transmission due to pressure from Grupo Globo directed toward Sistema Verdes Mares, who was responsible for TV Verdes Mares "because of the excessive growth in the TV Diário ratings in many markets in the country, including the Rio de Janeiro–São Paulo axis, which threatened the Rede Globo market niches".

After stopping satellite TV transmission, TV Diário's coverage was through over-the-air TV and cable TV only, with services restricted to the state of Ceará and neighboring regions in the northeast region of Brazil, as well as some cities in the state of São Paulo in the south. Rede União, another network from Ceará, became the only satellite TV broadcaster with a national reach from the state. Rede Globo responded, "TV Globo, as the flagship of Rede Globo network and formed by a group of 121 affiliate stations, seeks to accommodate VHF and UHF signals so that they are confined to their respective coverage areas. This way, through mutual understanding and respect for reciprocal interests, TV Diário operations will be restricted to its coverage territory, and it will no longer be available in the territories of other affiliates. Its signal will continue on satellite covering the state of Ceará, however, it will be scrambled". Rede Globo's conduct was widely criticized; residents from the northeastern Brazil promoted a boycott of the network on 13 March 2009, but the movement did not take place.

A similar occurrence took place with Amazon Sat TV, the property of Amazon Network, in which it could be received freely by satellite dish from the year 1998 to 2004. From then on, the signal was scrambled and a satellite digital receiver with an access card became required. Starting in 2014, Amazon Sat TV became available nationally through the satellite SES-6 used by Oi TV (not part of Grupo Globo).

Defamation lawsuit
On 16 September 2008, comedians Casseta & Planeta performed a sketch deemed as offensive in their comedy show Casseta & Planeta, Urgente! broadcast by Rede Globo. The sketch featured a fictional handicapped political candidate character called "Tinoco the Stump Man" without any arms or legs, who declared to the audience: "You know me: I am Tinoco the Stump Man. Vote for me, for I cannot rob without my hands, and if I do rob, I cannot run". This led the Brazilian Gay, Lesbian, Bisexual, Transvestite and Transsexual Association (ABGLT) to file a complaint with the Regional Prosecutor for Citizen Rights in São Paulo against Rede Globo for defamation against the physically disabled.

Name mix-up 
In 2011, Rede Globo was sued by bartender Igor Pachi, who had his image mixed up with that of Big Brother Brazil contestant Igor Gramani. According to his lawyer Shirley Klouri, "Rede Globo, the websites for Grupo Globo, and the [satellite TV] channel Multishow broadcast photos and videos of her client in ads for the program which caused problems for him". Pachi was granted an injunction asking for the retraction, and compensation equal to no less than 150 times the minimum yearly wage.

Report on women in the Arab world 

Rede Globo's Fantástico program aired a story on 29 June 2014 entitled "Women are seen as the property of men in Lebanon". The story talked about violence against women in Arab countries, particularly in Lebanon, and aimed to show how women are seen as the property of men after marriage and are victims of rape, domestic violence, and murder. The report sparked commotion in the Arab community, and many Arab viewers sent letters to Rede Globo accusing them of showing a prejudiced view of Lebanese women.

The Federation of American-Arabs said in a statement: "It is imperative to address this problem, which acquires dramatic contours worldwide. But it is our duty to draw attention to the fact that, depending on how the information is conveyed, it completely distorts facts and contributes greatly to create prejudice, stereotypes, and negative social representations of an entire country, for example". On 9 July 2014, members of São Paulo's Arab and Lebanese community gathered outside the headquarters of Rede Globo and held a protest against the report. The protesters demanded the right of reply and a retraction by Rede Globo.

Report on international student exchange program 
In 2015, Rede Globo was featured on the Ciência sem Fronteiras international scholarship program and stated that the Brazilian government had delayed the disbursement of funds, thus forcing medical student Amanda Oliveira to return to Brazil from abroad. Oliveira mentioned on her Facebook page that "it's all lies": "Rede Globo, besides being sensationalist, is still not able to find out the facts before speaking out" and "my experience with Ciência sem Fronteiras could not have been better". She stated that her reason for returning to Brazil was that her university classes were about to start.

Tiradentes 
Rede Globo violated historical conservation standards of the Igreja Matriz de Santo Antônio church in the city of Tiradentes when filming the miniseries Hilda Furacão, based on the novel of the same name. The filming was authorized by Elvio Garcia, who was the mayor of Tiradentes as well as a member of the Brazilian Social Democracy Party.

Accusations against Antônio Palocci 
In the announcement given to Operation Car Wash, Antônio Palocci stated that Rede Globo was involved in a multimillion-dollar loan scheme involving public companies, tax evasion, and outside companies.

Gloob Controversy

Gloob, a Kids channel controlled by TV Globo was called out by the Miraculous Ladybug fandom because Gloob was accused of giving an ecsess of spoilers of the new season of the series  for their audience.

See also 
 Rede Globo History
 Partido da Imprensa Golpista
 Censorship in Brazil
 Beyond Citizen Kane
 Concentration of media ownership
 Operation Mockingbird
 Caio Blinder
 Guga Chacra

Bibliography 
 
 
 
 JÁCOME, Phellipy. A constituição moderna do jornalismo no Brasil. Curitiba: Appris, 2020. 302 p. (Coleção ciências da comunicação).  .

References

External links 
 Opinião: Rede Globo, a "TV irrealidade" que ilude o Brasil The New York Times

TV Globo
Grupo Globo subsidiaries
Brazilian journalism
Concentration of media ownership
Media bias
Media bias controversies